Liolaemus acostai is a species of lizard in the family  Liolaemidae. It is native to Argentina.

References

acostai
Reptiles described in 2013
Reptiles of Argentina
Taxa named by Cristian Simón Abdala
Taxa named by Viviana Isabel Juárez Heredia